Kingswood is a stop on the Luas light-rail tram system in Dublin, Ireland.  It opened in 2004 as a stop on the Red Line.  The stop is located on a section of reserved track at the side of the R383 road, near the Kingswood heights housing estate.  It provides access to the Tallaght Medical Centre.  
The stop is also served by Dublin Bus route 56A.

References

Luas Red Line stops in South Dublin (county)